Maraita is a municipality in the Honduran department of Francisco Morazán.

Municipalities of the Francisco Morazán Department